Jens Christian Magnus (13 July 1920 – 9 January 2017) was a Norwegian military officer and politician for the Conservative Party.

He was born in Kristiania and finished his secondary education at Ris in 1939. During the German occupation of Norway he took actively part in resistance activities of Milorg D13, the district of Oslo, Bærum and Asker. He graduated with the cand.jur. degree in 1946. He later pursued a military career, and was promoted to Lieutenant in 1947, Captain in 1948, Major in 1951, Colonel in 1968 and Brigadier in 1975. As a politician he was elected to the municipal council in Bodin from 1964 to 1968, and in Bærum from 1973 to 1978. He resided in Høvik. He died on 9 January 2017 at the age of 96.

References

1920 births
2017 deaths
Military personnel from Oslo
Norwegian resistance members
Norwegian Army personnel
Royal Norwegian Air Force personnel
Bærum politicians
Conservative Party (Norway) politicians